Bronwyn Thompson (born 29 January 1978 in Rockhampton, Australia) is a long jumper from Australia. She was the former Commonwealth record holder and holds the Australian record for the long jump. She has been ranked as high as number two in the world. Her greatest achievements include winning gold in the long jump at the 2006 Commonwealth Games and placing fourth at the 2004 Olympic Games. However Bronwyn has suffered numerous injury setbacks during her career and retired at the end of the 2008/09 Australian domestic season

Bronwyn was born in Rockhampton as the youngest of four children and moved to her current home of Brisbane, Australia during primary school. As a child she excelled at both athletics and volleyball, but eventually chose to focus on athletics. She missed selection on the Australian team for the long jump at the 1996 World Junior Championships, which resulted in her decision to take a break from athletics and concentrate on her studies.

After completing a degree in physiotherapy Bronwyn returned to athletics in 2000, and later that year represented Australia in the long jump at the 2000 Olympic Games in Sydney, narrowly missing a place in the final.  Her performance was hampered by a large tumor which had been discovered in her take off foot, and after the games Bronwyn underwent surgery to have it removed. In 2001 her performances continued to improve, and she broke the Australian long jump record, previously held by Nicole Boegman. In 2002 Bronwyn improved her Australian record with a jump of 7.00m, which remains her personal best. She was again restricted by injury at the 2002 Commonwealth Games in Manchester, finishing sixth in the long jump despite going in as the favourite. At the 2003 World Championships in Paris, Bronwyn finished seventh in the final, despite further injury concerns.

Bronwyn carried good form into the 2004 Olympic Games in Athens and produced a best jump of 6.96m, but narrowly missed out on a medal, finishing fourth behind a trio of Russian athletes. A week later however, Bronwyn suffered a horrific knee injury at a meet in Rieti, Italy, which threatened to end her career. It took more than a year for her to return to competition, but at the 2006 Commonwealth Games in Melbourne she was able to once again produce her best form and dominated the long jump to win gold with a leap of 6.97m. Bronwyn went on to represent Australia at both the 2007 World Championships and the 2008 Olympic Games, but was unable to qualify for the final at either event.

Bronwyn has continued to practice as a pediatric physiotherapist in addition to her athletics career, as well as serving as a director of Athletics Australia via her position as chairperson of the Athletes Commission. She has been coached by Gary Bourne since 2000, and was married to husband Jason Chipperfield in 2006.

Achievements

References

External links

Athletics Australia profile
Official website

1978 births
Living people
Australian female long jumpers
Athletes (track and field) at the 2000 Summer Olympics
Athletes (track and field) at the 2004 Summer Olympics
Athletes (track and field) at the 2008 Summer Olympics
Olympic athletes of Australia
Athletes (track and field) at the 2006 Commonwealth Games
Commonwealth Games gold medallists for Australia
People educated at MacGregor State High School
Commonwealth Games medallists in athletics
Goodwill Games medalists in athletics
Competitors at the 2001 Goodwill Games
Athletes from Brisbane
Sportswomen from Queensland
Medallists at the 2006 Commonwealth Games